Chain is the debut Japanese extended play (fourth overall) by South Korean boy band NCT 127, the multi-national and second sub-unit of NCT. The five-track extended play was released on May 23, 2018 by their Japanese record label Avex Trax. With SM Entertainment's founder Lee Soo-man serving as the executive producer, the electropop, hip-hop and R&B record featured composition from production team Caesar & Loui, Kanata Okajima, 250, Albin Nordqvist, Kenzie, Mike Daley, MZMC, Harvey Mason Jr., J Que, Kevin Randolph, Mitchell Owens, Deez, Tay Jasper, Andrew Choi, MEG.ME and others. It was preceded by the Japanese version of "Limitless" as the first single on November 4, 2017, followed by the eponymous second single on May 8, 2018. To further promote the release, the group had their first showcase tour prior to its release.

Upon its release, Chain achieved commercial success for the group. It debuted at number two of the Oricon Weekly Albums chart with 44,832 copies sold on its first week of release, eventually went on to achieve a total of 49,289 copies in Japan. In addition, the extended play also debuted at number eight on the Billboard World Albums Chart, earning the group's their fourth top-ten entry. It was NCT 127's last album to feature the nine-original member line-up, before the addition of member Jungwoo later in September 2018.

Background and release
In late 2017, SM Entertainment announced that NCT 127 would be one of their two idol groups to debut and hold accompanying showcase tour in Japan during spring of 2018, having signed with Japanese label Avex Trax for further marketing and promotion along with fellow labelmate Red Velvet. The group then revealed the extended play's title to be Chain on March 31, 2018, as well as the album covers and tracklist. It was released in a total of thirteen editions: ten CDs (nine being limited edition individual covers and a normal pressing CD), two CD+DVDs (one limited and one normal edition), and a limited edition cassette tape.

The title track "Chain" later received a Korean version which is included in the repackaged version of the group's first album, Regular-Irregular several months later.

The song 'Come Back' later received a Korean and Chinese version. The Korean version was featured in NCT 127's first album Regular-Irregular. The Chinese version was featured twice by WayV; First in the debut digital EP: The Vision and then in their first mini album: Take Off.

Track listing
Credits adapted from Naver.

Note: The cassette edition of the EP consists of tracks 1–3 on Side A and tracks 4–5 on Side B.

Charts

References

2018 EPs
SM Entertainment EPs
Japanese-language EPs
Avex Group EPs
NCT 127 albums
IRiver EPs